Hannelius is a surname. Notable people with the surname include:

 G Hannelius (born 1998), American actress and singer-songwriter
 Lennart Hannelius (1893–1950), Finnish sport shooter